Manuel Rodríguez Araneda (18 January 1939 – 26 September 2018) was a Chilean football defender who played for Chile in the 1962 FIFA World Cup. He also played for Unión Española.

References

External links

1939 births
2018 deaths
Chilean footballers
Chile international footballers
Association football defenders
Unión Española footballers
Unión Española managers
Coquimbo Unido managers
1962 FIFA World Cup players
Chilean football managers
Footballers from Santiago
Magallanes managers
Cobresal managers
Everton de Viña del Mar managers
Deportes Iquique managers